Auditorio is a Mexico City Metro station located on line 7. It is one of the main metro gateways (along with Metro Polanco) to the chic and business-related neighborhood, Polanco. The entrances to the station are on Paseo de la Reforma, one of the main thoroughfares in Mexico City.

Its symbol depicts the façade of the Auditorio Nacional, which is just above the station. The auditorium is one of the main venues for concerts, shows and entertainment in the city, so almost every weekend night, this station is used by the attendants to the events.
The station opened on 23 August 1985.

General information
This station is also frequently used by tourists because of its proximity to many landmarks of the city, such as Chapultepec. Outside the station, just in front of the Auditorio Nacional, is the main station of the Turibus, a double-deck bus that runs a touristic route that goes from Chapultepec Park to the Historic Center along Reforma.

During weekdays, this station is also one of the busiest ones of the network because it is an entrance to the business, office and financial area in Polanco. Outside the station there is also one of the main microbus stops in the area; these microbuses transport people coming from the metro to other business and commercial zones in the city like northern Polanco, Palmas, Santa Fe, Lomas de Chapultepec and Satélite.

During rush hour, due to the large mass of people taking these buses outside the metro station and to the poor infrastructure of the microbus stops, heavy traffic is originated in this part of Paseo de la Reforma. Criticism has also been made to the layout of this metro station (among others of Line 7) because the heavy flows of people are not well managed; during rush hours flows of people walking in different directions often face each other causing a decrease in the speed of pedestrian traffic. Other problems concern the bottlenecks at bridges, narrow tunnels, escalators, and normal stairs due to low capacity.

Ridership

Nearby
Auditorio Nacional, concert and entertainment venue.
Campo Marte, equestrian and military facility.
Bosque de Chapultepec, city park and zoo.
Centro Cultural del Bosque, theater.
Jardín Winston Churchill, small garden and park which includes a statue of Winston Churchill.
National Museum of Anthropology, the largest and most visited museum of Mexico

Gallery

References

External links
 
 

Auditorio
Chapultepec
Mexico City Metro stations in Miguel Hidalgo, Mexico City
Paseo de la Reforma
Railway stations opened in 1985
1985 establishments in Mexico
Accessible Mexico City Metro stations